The Comunidade Intermunicipal da Região de Coimbra (English: Coimbra Region) is an administrative division in Portugal. It was created in October 2013, replacing the previously existing Greater Metropolitan Area of Coimbra. Since January 2015, Região de Coimbra is also a NUTS3 subregion of Centro Region, that covers the same area as the intermunicipal community. The main city and seat of the intermunicipal community is Coimbra. The population in 2011 was 460,139, in an area of 4,335.57 km².

Municipalities

The intermunicipal community of Região de Coimbra consists of 19 municipalities:

The territory of the Região de Coimbra equals that of the former Coimbra District, enlarged with the municipalities Mealhada (Aveiro district) and Mortágua (Viseu district).

References

Cities within Coimbra Region
The main cities are Cantanhede, Coimbra (chief city), Figueira da Foz, Mealhada, Oliveira do Hospital. The principal harbour is in Figueira da Foz.

External links
Official website Região de Coimbra

Coimbra
Intermunicipal communities of Portugal
Centro Region, Portugal